In abstract algebra, a normal subgroup (also known as an invariant subgroup or self-conjugate subgroup) is a subgroup that is invariant under conjugation by members of the group of which it is a part. In other words, a subgroup  of the group  is normal in  if and only if  for all  and  The usual notation for this relation is 

Normal subgroups are important because they (and only they) can be used to construct quotient groups of the given group.

Évariste Galois was the first to realize the importance of the existence of normal subgroups.

Definitions 

Equivalent conditions
For any subgroup  of  the following conditions are equivalent to  being a normal subgroup of  Therefore, any one of them may be taken as the definition:

  is a union of conjugacy classes of 
  is preserved by the inner automorphisms of 
 There is some group homomorphism  whose kernel is 
 For all  and  the commutator  is in 
 Any two elements commute regarding the normal subgroup membership relation.  That is, for all   if and only if

Examples 
Other named normal subgroups of an arbitrary group include the center of the group (the set of elements that commute with all other elements) and the commutator subgroup   More generally, since conjugation is an isomorphism, any characteristic subgroup is a normal subgroup.

A concrete example of a normal subgroup is the subgroup  of the symmetric group  consisting of the identity and both three-cycles.

In the Rubik's Cube group, the subgroups consisting of operations which only affect the orientations of either the corner pieces or the edge pieces are normal.

The translation group is a normal subgroup of the Euclidean group in any dimension. This means: applying a rigid transformation, followed by a translation and then the inverse rigid transformation, has the same effect as a single translation. By contrast, the subgroup of all rotations about the origin is not a normal subgroup of the Euclidean group, as long as the dimension is at least 2: first translating, then rotating about the origin, and then translating back will typically not fix the origin and will therefore not have the same effect as a single rotation about the origin.

Properties 

 A normal subgroup of a normal subgroup of a group need not be normal in the group. That is, normality is not a transitive relation. The smallest group exhibiting this phenomenon is the dihedral group of order 8. However, a characteristic subgroup of a normal subgroup is normal. A group in which normality is transitive is called a T-group.
 If the group  is a semidirect product  then  is normal in  though  need not be normal in 
 Normality is preserved on taking direct products; that is, if  and  then 
 Every subgroup of index 2 is normal. In particular, if  is the smallest prime dividing the order of  then every subgroup of index  is normal.
For example, a non-identity finite group is simple if and only if it is isomorphic to all of its non-identity homomorphic images, a finite group is perfect if and only if it has no normal subgroups of prime index, and a group is imperfect if and only if the derived subgroup is not supplemented by any proper normal subgroup.
 Every group G possesses at least two normal subgroups namely G and the subgroup consisting of the identity element e alone. These are called improper normal subgroups.
 If G is an abelian group, every subgroup H of G is normal in G.

Lattice of normal subgroups 

The lattice is complete and modular.

Normal subgroups, quotient groups and homomorphisms 

If  is a normal subgroup, we can define a multiplication on cosets as follows: 

This relation defines a mapping  To show that this mapping is well-defined, one needs to prove that the choice of representative elements  does not affect the result. To this end, consider some other representative elements  Then there are  such that  It follows that where we also used the fact that  is a  subgroup, and therefore there is  such that  This proves that this product is a well-defined mapping between cosets.

It is also easy to see that the kernel of the quotient map,  is  itself, so the normal subgroups are precisely the kernels of homomorphisms with domain

Normal subgroups and Sylow Theorem

There is a direct corollary of the theorem above:
Let  be a finite group and  a Sylow p-subgroup for some prime .

See also

Operations taking subgroups to subgroups
Normalizer
Conjugate closure
Normal core

Subgroup properties complementary (or opposite) to normality
Malnormal subgroup
Contranormal subgroup
Abnormal subgroup
Self-normalizing subgroup

Subgroup properties stronger than normality
Characteristic subgroup
Fully characteristic subgroup

Subgroup properties weaker than normality
Subnormal subgroup
Ascendant subgroup
Descendant subgroup
Quasinormal subgroup
Seminormal subgroup
Conjugate permutable subgroup
Modular subgroup
Pronormal subgroup
Paranormal subgroup
Polynormal subgroup
C-normal subgroup

Related notions in algebra
Ideal (ring theory)

Notes

References

Further reading 
 I. N. Herstein, Topics in algebra.  Second edition. Xerox College Publishing, Lexington, Mass.-Toronto, Ont., 1975. xi+388 pp.

External links 
 
 Normal subgroup in Springer's Encyclopedia of Mathematics
 Robert Ash: Group Fundamentals in Abstract Algebra. The Basic Graduate Year
 Timothy Gowers, Normal subgroups and quotient groups
 John Baez, What's a Normal Subgroup?

Subgroup properties